Çifte Minareli Medrese may refer to:
 Çifte Minareli Medrese (Erzurum), an architectural monument
 Çifte Minareli Medrese (Sivas), a former medrese